Prof. Vasant Chindhuji Purke is an Indian politician. He was elected to the Maharashtra Legislative Assembly from Ralegaon, Maharashtra in 1995 until 2014 as a member of the Indian National Congress.

References 

Speakers of the Maharashtra Legislative Assembly
Maharashtra MLAs 2009–2014
Living people
People from Yavatmal district
Year of birth missing (living people)